Walton High School is a public high school in DeFuniak Springs, Walton County, Florida operated by the Walton County School District. Walton High School opened a new school building in 2010 after the school district approved the facility. The new building was built next to the previous facility which is now the WISE Center for alternative education. The school's athletic teams' mascot are the Braves. The school is located at 449 Walton Road in DeFuniak Springs.

State Championships

1985 – Football (defeated Wildwood 7–2)

Alumni

Kyrsten Sinema – US Democratic politician from Arizona
Ed Robinson - NFL Linebacker
Dexter McNabb - NFL Running back

See also
South Walton High School

References

Educational institutions in the United States with year of establishment missing
Public high schools in Florida
Schools in Walton County, Florida